Inside the Dream Syndicate, Vol. I: Day of Niagara or simply Day of Niagara is a bootleg recording of a 1965 performance by the minimalist music group the Theatre of Eternal Music, a.k.a. the Dream Syndicate. Contributors include future Velvet Underground members John Cale and Angus Maclise, composers La Monte Young and Tony Conrad, and artist Marian Zazeela. It received a release in 2000 by the label Table of the Elements against the wishes of Young.

Overview
The original master tape of the recording was illicitly copied several decades before it found its way to Table of the Elements for release by composer and visual artist Arnold Dreyblatt, who had been employed as Young's archivist assistant. La Monte Young threatened legal action against the label, as there had been no written agreement on who actually owned the rights to the music; however, no legal action was eventually taken.

As it was sourced from a copy of a copy of the original tape, the recording quality noticeably suffers. Young published a press release describing extensive problems with the release, including errors in the audio quality of the copied source tape, an unbalanced mix, and uninspired artwork.

Track listing
"Day of Niagara" - 30:52

References

Minimalistic compositions
John Cale albums
Theatre of Eternal Music albums
Collaborative albums
2000 albums
1965 compositions
Compositions in just intonation